Contact North is a distance education network in the Canadian province of Ontario, with 112 online learning centres throughout the province. Based principally in Sudbury and Thunder Bay, the network partners with Ontario's 24 public colleges, 22 public universities and 250 public literacy and essential skills and training providers to help Ontarians in over 600 communities across the province participate in education and training opportunities without leaving their own community.

The organization's student portal helps students and prospective students across the province find information on more than 18,000 online courses and more than 1,000 online programs offered by Ontario's public high schools, colleges and universities.

Contact North also acts as an advocate, catalyst and facilitator of innovation in online and distance learning, as well as assisting in the creation and development of distance education programs in other provinces and countries.

History

In 1986, Contact North was established by the Ontario government to provide fully bilingual access to courses and programs offered by colleges, universities and high schools to residents of Ontario's northern communities. Contact North remains primarily funded by the Ministry of Training, Colleges and Universities.

In 1992, through funding from the Ministry of Northern Development and Mines, almost every secondary school in Northern Ontario was equipped with Contact North audiographic teleconferencing equipment. This equipment gave all schools electronic access to more than 100 other schools in communities across Northern Ontario and beyond. It also allowed high school students a chance to tour museums, galleries, and other organizations electronically, which the student would not otherwise get a chance to visit. Some of these places include Art Gallery of Ontario, located in Toronto, and the Royal Canadian Mint in Ottawa.

In 2007, the Ministry of Training, Colleges and Universities announced the launch of a distance education network to provide access to post-secondary education opportunities for residents of small and rural communities across Southern Ontario. The new network was developed to operate under a model similar to Contact North, and Contact North was asked to help in facilitating the startup of the project.  Originally called the Eastern and Southern Ontario Distance and Education Network, the new network became elearnnetwork.ca.

In the fall of 2009 Contact North unveiled elearntube.ca as a video-sharing website for partnered colleges and universities to post media.

Education and training partners
Contact North works with 44 colleges and universities across Ontario. Through a combination of audioconference, videoconference and e-learning technologies, students access programs and courses offered by these partner institutions at its online learning centres.  Contact North also supports the delivery of fully online courses by these institutions through a variety of support services to students of these institutions.

Algoma University
Brock University
Carleton University
Lakehead University
Laurentian University
McMaster University
Nipissing University
Queens University
Royal Military College of Canada
Ryerson University
Trent University
Thorneloe University
University of Guelph
University of Ontario Institute of Technology
University of Ottawa
University of Sudbury
University of Toronto
University of Waterloo
University of Western Ontario
University of Windsor
Wilfrid Laurier University
York University
Algonquin College
Collège Boréal
Cambrian College
Centennial College
Conestoga College
Confederation College
George Brown College
Georgian College
Canadore College
Durham College
Fanshawe College
Humber College
La Cité
Lambton College
Loyalist College
Mohawk College
Niagara College
Northern College
Sault College
Seneca College
Sheridan College
St. Clair College
St. Lawrence College
Fleming College

Online learning centres
Contact North's online learning centres serve over 600 small, rural, remote, indigenous and francophone communities across the province of Ontario. Each centre has staff who can assist students with the technology or with registering for courses. All centres are equipped with computer workstations, Internet, e-learning, audio conferencing, video conferencing (limited number of communities where this is not available) and web conferencing capabilities.

Online learning centres are located in the following communities:

denotes First Nation

Astorville
Atikokan
Attawapiskat*
Bear Island*
Beardmore
Big Grassy First Nation*
Big Trout Lake*
Blind River
Bonfield
Bracebridge
Bruce Mines
Chapleau
Cochrane
Constance Lake*
Cornwall
Dokis*
Dryden
Ear Falls
Earlton
Elliot Lake
Emo
Englehart
Espanola
Exeter
Fort Frances
Georgina
Geraldton
Gogama
Gore Bay
Haileybury
Haliburton
Hawkesbury
Hearst
Hornepayne
Ignace
Iroquois Falls
Kapuskasing
Kenora
Kincardine
Kirkland Lake
Latchford
Longlac
Madoc
Magnetawan*
Manitouwadge
Marathon
Massey
Matachewan*
Matheson
Mattawa
Mississaugas of the New Credit First Nation*
Moose Factory*
Moosonee
M'Chigeeng
Nakina
Nipigon
Nipissing*
Noëlville
Nolalu
North Bay
North Caribou Lake*
Onaping
Orléans
Parry Sound
Pic Mobert*
Pic River*
Pickle Lake
Port Hope
Rainy River
Ramore
Red Lake
Red Rock
Richards Landing
Rocky Bay*
Sagamok*
Sandy Lake*
Sault Ste. Marie
Schreiber
Serpent River*
Shelburne
Sioux Lookout
Six Nations*
Smooth Rock Falls
South Porcupine
South River
Spanish
St. Catharines
St. Charles
St. Thomas
Stratford
Sturgeon Falls
Sudbury
Summer Beaver*
Temagami
Terrace Bay
Thessalon*
Thorne
Thunder Bay
Virginiatown
Wahgoshig*
Wallaceburg
Warren
Wasauksing*
Wawa
White River
Wikwemikong First Nation*
Windsor-Tecumseh
Wunnumin Lake*

References

External links
 

Educational organizations based in Ontario
Distance education in Canada
Companies based in Greater Sudbury
Companies based in Thunder Bay